The 1949–50 Irish Cup was the 70th edition of the premier knock-out cup competition in Northern Irish football. 

The defending champions were Derry City, however they were defeated 2-0 in the semi-finals by Linfield.

Linfield won the cup for the 25th time, defeating Distillery 2–1 in the final at Windsor Park.

Results

First round

|}

Replay

|}

Quarter-finals

|}

Semi-finals

|}

Final

References

External links
The Rec.Sport.Soccer Statistics Foundation - Northern Ireland - Cup Finals

Irish Cup seasons
1949–50 in Northern Ireland association football
1949–50 domestic association football cups